Cubophis cantherigerus, the  Cuban racer, is a species of snake in the family Colubridae. The species is native to Cuba and
The Bahamas.

References

Cubophis
Snakes of North America
Reptiles described in 1843
Reptiles of the Bahamas
Reptiles of Cuba
Taxa named by Gabriel Bibron